Eucoptacra is a genus of grasshoppers in the family Acrididae and subfamily Coptacrinae. Species can be found in: Africa, India, Indo-China, peninsular Malaysia and Borneo.

Species
The Catalogue of Life lists:
Eucoptacra abbreviata Ingrisch, Willemse & Shishodia, 2004
Eucoptacra anguliflava Karsch, 1893
Eucoptacra basidens Chapman, 1960
Eucoptacra bicornis Baccetti, 2004
Eucoptacra bidens Uvarov, 1953
Eucoptacra binghami Uvarov, 1921
Eucoptacra borneensis Willemse, 1962
Eucoptacra brevidens Uvarov, 1953
Eucoptacra ceylonica Kirby, 1914
Eucoptacra exigua Bolívar, 1912
Eucoptacra gowdeyi Uvarov, 1923
Eucoptacra granulata Mason, 1979
Eucoptacra inamoena Walker, 1871
Eucoptacra incompta Walker, 1871
Eucoptacra kwangtungensis Tinkham, 1940
Eucoptacra minima Ramme, 1941
Eucoptacra motuoensis Yin, 1984
Eucoptacra nana Uvarov, 1953
Eucoptacra paupercula Kirby, 1902
Eucoptacra poecila Uvarov, 1939
Eucoptacra praemorsa Stål, 1861 - type species (as Acridium praemorsum Stål)
Eucoptacra sheffieldi Bolívar, 1912
Eucoptacra signata Bolívar, 1889
Eucoptacra similis Uvarov, 1953
Eucoptacra spathulacauda Jago, 1966
Eucoptacra torquata Bolívar, 1912
Eucoptacra turneri Miller, 1932

References

External links
 
 

Acrididae genera